The United Cup is an international hard court tennis tournament featuring mixed-gender teams from 18 countries. The first event was held in December 2022 through January 2023.The tournament is played across three Australian cities over 11 days in the leadup to the Australian Open. It is also the first mixed-gender team event to offer both ATP rankings and WTA rankings points to its players: a player will be able to win a maximum of 500 points.

History
On 7 August 2022, Tennis Australia announced that the ATP Cup, which was an international outdoor hard court men's team tournament played in the Australian summer, would be shut down and replaced by a mixed-gender event from 2023. Thus, the first edition of the United Cup directly replaced the ATP Cup (2020–2022) on the ATP Tour calendar.

Tournament

Format
Every tie in the tournament consists of 2 men's singles matches, 2 women's singles matches, and a mixed doubles match.

Each tie is split into two sessions played in different days. In the first day 1 men's singles match and 1 women's singles match take place; in the second day another men's singles match and another women's singles match take place, followed by a mixed doubles match.

Each city hosts two groups of three countries in a round robin format on the first week of the tournament. One group in each city plays all its ties in the morning sessions while the other plays in the evening sessions.

The group winners in each city play off in a city final for one of three semifinal spots. This city final is played in one day across a morning and an evening session. Of the three losing teams, one with the best record up to that point becomes the fourth semifinalist.

There is a travel day allocated before the semifinals and finals take place in Sydney.

Semifinal ties take place over 2 days (similarly to the round robin stage). The final takes place on one day. In case the tie's winner is decided after 4 singles matches, the mixed doubles match will not be played.

Qualification
18 countries qualify as follows:

Six countries qualify based on the ATP ranking of their number one ranked singles player.
Six countries qualify based on the WTA ranking of their number one ranked singles player.
The final six countries qualify based on the combined ranking of their number one ranked ATP and WTA players.

In exchange for being the host nation, Australia is guaranteed one of the spots reserved for teams with the best combined ranking if it fails to qualify on its own.

Teams feature three or four players from each tour.

Venues
Brisbane, Perth and Sydney each host two groups of three countries in a round robin format and the host city finals in the first seven days of the tournament. Sydney will host the semifinals and the final on the last four days of the tournament.

Finals

Results by nation

References

External links
Official website

Tennis tournaments in Australia
Hard court tennis tournaments
ATP Tour
WTA Tour
Sports competitions in Brisbane
Sports competitions in Perth, Western Australia
Sports competitions in Sydney
Annual sporting events in Australia
International men's tennis team competitions
Mixed doubles tennis
Recurring sporting events established in 2022
2022 establishments in Australia